Matan Barashi (born 6 May 1988, in Jerusalem) is an Israeli footballer who currently plays for Ironi Beit Shemesh.

He spent the 2009–10 season in the Liga Leumit on loan at Hapoel Jerusalem, and played in Beitar Jerusalem until 2013. At international level, Barashi was capped at under-18 and under-19 level.

References

1988 births
Living people
Israeli footballers
Beitar Jerusalem F.C. players
Hapoel Jerusalem F.C. players
Hapoel Katamon Jerusalem F.C. players
Hakoah Maccabi Amidar Ramat Gan F.C. players
Hapoel Ironi Baqa al-Gharbiyye F.C. players
Hapoel Hod HaSharon F.C. players
Ihud Bnei Majd al-Krum F.C. players
Nordia Jerusalem F.C. players
Israeli Premier League players
Liga Leumit players
Footballers from Jerusalem
Israeli people of Kurdish-Jewish descent
Association football defenders